Drycothaea angustifrons is a species of beetle in the family Cerambycidae. It was described by Breuning in 1943. It is known from French Guiana and Ecuador.

References

Calliini
Beetles described in 1943